was a town located in Iyo District, Ehime Prefecture, Japan.

As of 2003, the town had an estimated population of 4,256 and a density of 56.43 persons per km². The total area was 75.42 km².

On April 1, 2005, Nakayama, along with the town of Futami (also from Iyo District), was merged into the expanded city of Iyo.

External links
 Iyo official website 

Dissolved municipalities of Ehime Prefecture
Iyo, Ehime